Porcellio expansus is a species of woodlouse in the genus Porcellio belonging to the family Porcellionidae that can be found in mainland Spain.

References

Porcellionidae
Endemic fauna of Spain
Woodlice of Europe
Crustaceans described in 1892